João de Souza Mendes Júnior (23 June 1892 – 10 July 1969) was a seven-time Brazilian chess champion.

Born in the Azores, Portugal, Souza Mendes played in the Brazilian Chess Championship 29 times, winning in 1925 (the first year the tournament was held), 1928, 1929, 1930, 1943, 1954, and 1958. He finished second five times, the last time in 1965 at age 73 when thirteen-year-old Henrique Mecking won, and took third five times.

He played for Brazil in Chess Olympiads at Buenos Aires 1939 and Helsinki 1952.

Souza Mendes died in Rio de Janeiro.

References

External links

Souza Mendes' Chess Career  at brasilbase (photo, brief biography, tournament and match record, and game scores in PGN)

1892 births
1969 deaths
Brazilian chess players
Brazilian people of Portuguese descent
Chess Olympiad competitors
20th-century chess players